Cimolodonta is a taxon of extinct mammals that lived from the Cretaceous to the Eocene. They were some of the more derived members of the extinct order Multituberculata. They probably lived something of a rodent-like existence until their ecological niche was assumed by true rodents. The more basal multituberculates are found in a different suborder, "Plagiaulacida", a paraphyletic group containing all non cimolodontan multituberculates.

Cimolodonta is apparently a natural (monophyletic) suborder. Remains have been identified from across the Northern Hemisphere. They first appeared during the Aptian, and completely replaced the more primitive plagiaulacidans by the early Late Cretaceous. The taxon is recognized as the informal Paracimexomys group and the superfamilies Djadochtatherioidea, Taeniolabidoidea, and Ptilodontoidea. Additionally, and of uncertain affinities, are the families Cimolomyidae, Boffiidae, Eucosmodontidae, Kogaionidae, Microcosmodontidae and the two genera Uzbekbaatar and Viridomys. More precise placement of these types awaits further discoveries and analysis.

Taxonomy 

Suborder †Cimolodonta McKenna, 1975
 Superfamily Incertae sedis
 Family Incertae sedis
 Subfamily Incertae sedis
 Genus? Ameribaatar Eaton & Cifelli, 2001
 Genus? Bryceomys Eaton, 1995
 Genus Cedaromys Eaton & Cifelli, 2001
 Genus? Dakotamys Eaton, 1995; (Early Cretaceous, Central North America)
 Genus? Fractinus Higgins, 2003
 Genus Halodon Marsh, 1889
 Genus Ptilodus (Marsh, 1889) Gidley, 1909
 Genus? Uzbekbaatar Kielan-Jaworowska & Nesov, 1992
 Genus? Barbatodon Rãdulescu & Samson, 1986
 "Paracimexomys group" Archibald, 1982
 Genus Paracimexomys Archibald, 1982
 Genus? Cimexomys Fox, 1971
 Genus Cimexomys Sloan & Van Valen, 1965 sensu stricto?
 Family Boffiidae Hahn & Hahn, 1983
 Genus Boffius Vianey-Liaud, 1979
 Family Cimolomyidae Marsh, 1889 sensu Kielan-Jaworowska & Hurum, 2001
 Genus Essonodon Simpson, 1927
 Genus Buginbaatar Kielan-Jaworowska & Sochava, 1969
 Genus Meniscoessus Cope, 1882 (syn. Dipriodon Marsh, 1889, Tripriodon Marsh, 1889, Selenacodon Marsh, 1889, Halodon Marsh, 1889, Oracodon Marsh, 1889)
 Genus Cimolomys Marsh, 1889 (syn. ?Allacodon Marsh, 1889; Meniscoessus; Ptilodus; Selenacodon Marsh, 1889)
 Superfamily Ptilodontoidea Cope, 1887 sensu McKenna & Bell, 1997 & Kielan-Jaworowska & Hurum, 2001
 Family Cimolodontidae Marsh, 1889 sensu Kielan-Jaworowska & Hurum, 2001
 Genus Liotomus Lemoine, 1882
 Genus Essonodon Simpson, 1927
 Genus Anconodon Jepsen, 1940
 Genus Cimolodon Marsh, 1889 [syn. Nanomys Marsh, 1889, Nonomyops Marsh, 1892]
 Genus Neoliotomus Jepsen, 1930
 Family Ptilodontidae Cope, 1887 (syn Ptilodontinae Cope, 1887 sensu McKenna & Bell, 1997)
 Genus Kimbetohia Simpson, 1936
 Genus Ptilodus Cope, 1881 (Chirox Cope, 1884)
 Genus Baiotomeus Krause, 1987
 Genus Prochetodon Jepsen, 1940
 Family Neoplagiaulacidae Ameghino, 1890 (syn Neoplagiaulacinae Ameghino, 1890 sensu McKenna & Bell, 1997)
 Genus Mesodma Marsh, 1889
 Genus Ectypodus Matthew & Cranger, 1921 (Syn. Charlesmooria Kühne, 1969)
 Genus Mimetodon Jepsen, 1940
 Genus Neoplagiaulax Lemoine, 1882
 Genus Parectypodus Jepsen, 1930
 Genus Cernaysia Vianey-Liaud, 1986
 Genus Krauseia Vianey-Liaud, 1986
 Genus Xyronomys Rigby, 1980
 Genus Xanclomys Rigby, 1980
 Genus Mesodmops Tong & Wang, 1994
 Family Kogaionidae Rãdulescu & Samson, 1996
 Genus Barbatodon Rãdulescu & Samson, 1996
 Genus Hainina Vianey-Liaud, 1979
 Genus Kogaionon Rãdulescu & Samson, 1996 
 Family Eucosmodontidae Jepsen, 1940 sensu Kielan-Jaworowska & Hurum, 2001 (syn. Eucosmodontinae Jepsen, 1940 sensu McKenna & Bell, 1997)
 Genus Clemensodon Krause, 1992
 Genus Eucosmodon Matthew & Granger, 1921
 Genus Stygimys Sloan & Van Valen, 1965
 Family Microcosmodontidae Holtzman & Wolberg, 1977 (syn Microcosmodontinae Holtzman & Wolberg, 1977 McKenna & Bell, 1997)
 Genus Pentacosmodon Jepsen, 1940
 Genus Acheronodon Archibald, 1982
 Genus Microcosmodon Jepsen, 1930
 Superfamily Djadochtatherioidea Kielan-Jaworowska & Hurum, 1997 sensu Kielan-Jaworowska & Hurum, 2001 (syn Djadochtatheria Kielan-Jaworowska & Hurum, 1997)
 Genus? Bulganbaatar Kielan-Jaworowska, 1974
 Genus? Chulsanbaatar Kielan-Jaworowska, 1974
 Genus Nemegtbaatar Kielan-Jaworowska, 1974
 Family Sloanbaataridae  Kielan-Jaworowska, 1974
 Genus Kamptobaatar Kielan-Jaworowska, 1970
 Genus Nessovbaatar Kielan-Jaworowska & Hurum, 1997
 Genus Sloanbaatar Kielan-Jaworowska, 1974
 Family Djadochtatheriidae  Kielan-Jaworowska & Hurum, 1997
 Genus Djadochtatherium Simpson, 1925
 Genus Catopsbaatar Kielan-Jaworowska, 1974
 Genus Tombaatar Kielan-Jaworowska, 1974
 Genus Kryptobaatar Kielan-Jaworowska, 1970 (syn Gobibaatar Kielan-Jaworowska, 1970, Tugrigbaatar Kielan-Jaworowska & Dashzeveg, 1978)
 Superfamily Taeniolabidoidea Granger & Simpson, 1929 sensu Kielan-Jaworowska & Hurum, 2001
 Genus Prionessus Matthew & Granger, 1925
 Family Taeniolabididae Granger & Simpson, 1929
 Genus Kimbetopsalis Sarah, 2015
 Genus Taeniolabis Cope, 1882
 Family Lambdopsalidae
 Genus Sphenopsalis Matthew, Granger & Simpson, 1928
 Genus Lambdopsalis Chow & Qi, 1978

References 

 Kielan-Jaworowska Z. and Hurum J.H. (2001), "Phylogeny and Systematics of multituberculate mammals". Paleontology 44, p. 389-429.
 Much of this information has been derived from  Multituberculata Cope, 1884.

 
Eocene extinctions
Cretaceous first appearances